Albania has submitted films for the Academy Award for Best International Feature Film since 1996, but only a regular basis since 2008. The award is handed out annually by the United States Academy of Motion Picture Arts and Sciences to a feature-length motion picture produced outside the United States that contains primarily non-English dialogue. It was not created until the 1956 Academy Awards, in which a competitive Academy Award of Merit, known as the Best Foreign Language Film Award, was created for non-English speaking films, and has been given annually since.

The Albanian submission is decided by a committee appointed by the Albanian Ministry of Culture. Thirteen Albanian films have been submitted for the Academy Award for Best Foreign Language Film, but none of them has yet been nominated for an Oscar.

Submissions
The Academy of Motion Picture Arts and Sciences has invited the film industries of various countries to submit their best film for the Academy Award for Best Foreign Language Film since 1956. The Foreign Language Film Award Committee oversees the process and reviews all the submitted films. Following this, they vote via secret ballot to determine the five nominees for the award. The list of the films that have been submitted by Albania for review by the Academy for the award by year and the respective Academy Awards ceremony as follows.

Albania's first three films were historical tales set against the backdrop of the Enver Hoxha dictatorship which ruled Albania for over forty years. Bunker and Slogans take place in Albania in the late 1970s while Sadness takes place in 1961 Czechoslovakia. Colonel Bunker is a drama about a soldier tasked by Hoxha to build a network of impossibly elaborate structures ('bunkers') designed to resist a potential foreign invasion. Slogans is a lighter film satirizing the ideological obsessions of the Hoxha regime, and their suffocating influence over the life of a small, rural school. Both films are among the few Albanian films to win awards at international Film Festivals- Bunker won an award at Venice and Slogans was the very first Albanian film to play at Cannes. The Sadness of Mrs. Schneider, a Czech co-production, tells the story of a multi-ethnic group of friends studying cinema in Prague in the 1960s, and their travels around the Czechoslovak countryside.

In 2009, the selection committee originally considered three films. Two of these films were directed by Artan Minarolli. Albania ended up choosing a film set in the post-Communist era for the first time- Minarolli's Alive!- about a modern, young Albanian student who becomes involved with an ancient blood feud after returning to his home village for the funeral of his father.

Although, Albania itself has maintained a low profile in this category, four other countries in the region- Greece, Italy, Macedonia and Switzerland- have each submitted films about Albania and the Albanian diaspora to the Oscars.

See also
List of Academy Award winners and nominees for Best Foreign Language Film
List of Academy Award-winning foreign language films
Cinema of Albania

Notes

References

External links
The Official Academy Awards Database
The Motion Picture Credits Database
IMDb Academy Awards Page
Official Site of The Sadness of Mrs. Schneider
Variety review of "Alive"!

Best Foreign Language Film Academy Award submissions by country
Academy Award for Best Foreign Language Film